The 2017 Knoxville Challenger was a professional tennis tournament played on indoor hard courts. It was the fourteenth edition of the tournament which was part of the 2017 ATP Challenger Tour. It took place in Knoxville, United States between 7 and 12 November 2017.

Singles main-draw entrants

Seeds

 1 Rankings are as of October 30, 2017.

Other entrants
The following players received wildcards into the singles main draw:
  Jared Hiltzik
  Ronnie Schneider
  Timo Stodder
  Luis Valero

The following player received entry into the singles main draw using a protected ranking:
  Bradley Klahn

The following player received entry into the singles main draw as an alternate:
  Dennis Novikov

The following players received entry from the qualifying draw:
  Mats Moraing
  Frederik Nielsen
  Filip Peliwo
  Alexander Ward

The following player received entry as a lucky loser:
  Edward Corrie

Champions

Singles

 Filip Peliwo def.  Denis Kudla 6–4, 6–2.

Doubles

 Leander Paes /  Purav Raja def.  James Cerretani /  John-Patrick Smith 7–6(7–4), 7–6(7–4).

References

2017 ATP Challenger Tour
2017
2017 in American tennis
2017 in sports in Tennessee